Potassium tetracarbonyliron hydride is the inorganic salt with the formula K[HFe(CO)4].  A pale yellow solid, it is the potassium salt of [HFe(CO)4]−, which is the conjugate base of iron tetracarbonyl dihydride: 
H2Fe(CO)4  +  KOH  →  K[HFe(CO)4]  +  H2O

Potassium tetracarbonyliron hydride is prepared by treating iron pentacarbonyl with potassium hydroxide:
Fe(CO)5  +  2 KOH  →  K[HFe(CO)4]  +  KHCO3
Potassium tetracarbonyliron hydride is an intermediate in the synthesis of trisubstituted phosphine complexes:
K[HFe(CO)4]  +  3 PBu3  +  EtOH  →  Fe(CO)2(PBu3)3  +  EtOK  +  2 CO  +  H2

References

Carbonyl complexes
Iron complexes
Metal hydrides